Paul LaDue (born September 6, 1992) is an American professional ice hockey defenseman currently playing for the Bridgeport Islanders of the American Hockey League (AHL) while under contract to the New York Islanders of the National Hockey League (NHL). He was drafted by the Los Angeles Kings in the sixth round, 181st overall, in the 2012 NHL Entry Draft.

Playing career
LaDue played junior hockey with the Alexandria Blizzard of the North American Hockey League and the Lincoln Stars in the United States Hockey League before he was drafted by the Kings. Committing to a collegiate career, LaDue returned home to North Dakota to play with the University of North Dakota in the National Collegiate Hockey Conference.

Upon the conclusion of a successful junior year in 2015–16 season, helping the Fighting Hawks claim the National Championship, LaDue embarked on his professional career in agreeing to a one-year, entry-level contract with the Los Angeles Kings on April 30, 2016. He made his professional debut in joining AHL affiliate, the Ontario Reign, on an amateur try-out and appeared in 3 post-season games.

After attending his first training camp with the Kings and turning heads in the pre-season, LaDue began his rookie campaign re-assigned to the Reign to begin the 2016–17 season. While placing second amongst blueliners in scoring, LaDue received his first recall to the NHL on February 1, 2017. He made his NHL debut with the Kings in a 5–0 shutout defeat to the Tampa Bay Lightning on February 7, 2017. He recorded his first point, an assist on a goal to Dwight King, in his second contest, a 6–3 victory over the Florida Panthers on February 9, 2017.

On October 10, 2020, LaDue was signed as a free agent to a one-year, two-way contract with the Washington Capitals. On September 20, 2021, LaDue was signed to a one-year contract by the New York Islanders.

Personal life
LaDue comes from a hockey playing family; his uncles and cousin also played collegiate hockey for the University of North Dakota. His cousin Luke Johnson currently plays professional hockey for the Chicago Blackhawks organization in the National Hockey League.

Career statistics

Awards and honours

References

External links
 

1992 births
Living people
American men's ice hockey defensemen
Bridgeport Islanders players
Hershey Bears players
Lincoln Stars players
Los Angeles Kings draft picks
Los Angeles Kings players
New York Islanders players
North Dakota Fighting Hawks men's ice hockey players
Ice hockey people from North Dakota
Sportspeople from Grand Forks, North Dakota
Ontario Reign (AHL) players